The Bremond Block Historic District is a collection of eleven historic homes in downtown Austin, Texas, United States, constructed from the 1850s to 1910.

The block was added to National Register of Historic Places in 1970, and is considered one of the few remaining upper-class Victorian neighborhoods of the middle to late nineteenth century in Texas. Six of these houses were built or expanded for members of the families of brothers Eugene and John Bremond, who were prominent in late-nineteenth-century Austin social, merchandising, and banking circles. They are located within the square block bordered by West Seventh, West Eighth, Guadalupe, and San Antonio streets. The district also includes several houses on the west side of San Antonio and the south side of West Seventh, at least three of which were built or altered by the North family. The John and Pierre Bremond houses are currently owned by the Texas Classroom Teachers Association, and the John Bremond house serves as the headquarters for the association. TCTA website

Buildings in the Bremond Block Historic District
The historic district consists of eleven structures.

Gallery

References

External links
Handbook of Texas Online

American upper class
Neighborhoods in Austin, Texas
Historic districts on the National Register of Historic Places in Texas
National Register of Historic Places in Austin, Texas
Houses on the National Register of Historic Places in Texas
Houses in Austin, Texas
Gilded Age mansions